Philip Lawrence Stamp (born 12 December 1975) is an English former footballer, best known for his time with Middlesbrough and Heart of Midlothian. He made his first-team league debut for Middlesbrough on 10 October 1993, at the age of 17, in a 2–0 defeat to Watford. He started for Middlesbrough in the 1997 FA Cup Final defeat to Chelsea. After Middlesbrough he played for Heart of Midlothian and Darlington, scoring a superb free kick for the latter against Shrewsbury Town. and including a match against Notts County when he played in goal for the second half.

References

External links

1975 births
Footballers from Middlesbrough
Living people
English footballers
Association football midfielders
Middlesbrough F.C. players
Millwall F.C. players
Heart of Midlothian F.C. players
Darlington F.C. players
Premier League players
English Football League players
Scottish Premier League players
FA Cup Final players